For Olim is a live album by Cecil Taylor recorded in Berlin, Germany on April 9, 1986 and released on the Soul Note label. The album features a solo concert performance by Taylor.

According to the liner notes, the word "Olim" is "an Aztec hieroglyph meaning movement, motion, earthquake." The album is dedicated "to the living Spirit of Jimmy Lyons," the alto saxophone player who worked with Taylor for roughly 25 years, and who died a little over a month after the recording of the album.

Reception

The Penguin Guide to Jazz selected this album as part of its suggested "Core Collection" stating "nothing here does anything but speak directly to the attentive listener." The Allmusic review by Scott Yanow states: "One of Cecil Taylor's most satisfying solo concerts, this date features the always uncompromising and adventurous pianist exploring eight of his compositions, including a few that are quite brief (two are under two minutes). The difficult but lyrical live set rewards repeated listenings".

Track listing
All compositions by Cecil Taylor.
 "Olim" - 17:41 
 "Glossalalia Part Four" - 5:44 
 "Mirror and Water Gazing" - 4:01 
 "Living (Dedicated to Julian Beck)" - 6:59 
 "For the Death" - 1:33 
 "For the Rabbit" - 3:41 
 "For the Water Dog" - 1:44 
 "The Question" - 3:04 
Recorded in Berlin, Germany on April 9, 1986

Personnel
Cecil Taylor: piano

References

1987 live albums
Cecil Taylor live albums
Black Saint/Soul Note live albums
Instrumental albums
Solo piano jazz albums